TESCAN is one of the world's leading manufacturers[1] of Scanning Electron Microscopes (SEM), Focused Ion Beam-Scanning Electron Microscopes (FIB-SEM), Scanning Transmission Electron Microscopes (STEM), and microcomputed tomography (microCT).[2] TESCAN serves customers in materials science, geosciences, life sciences and semiconductor markets. TESCAN is located in Brno (Czech Republic), which is considered to be the cradle of electron microscopy in Europe.[3] TESCAN has now produced over 3,000 SEMs and FIB-SEMs [4].

History

The history of electron microscope production in Czechoslovakia dates back to the 1950s when a team led by Armin Delong in Brno started to produce electron microscopes.[5] One of the first successful microscopes was the Tesla BS 242 model, which won a gold medal at the EXPO 1958.[5] During its 30-year existence [6], Tesla produced over 3,000 different models of microscopes which were exported to over 20 countries.

After the Velvet Revolution, Tesla was divided into several smaller companies. Some of them still operate in the electron microscope market. One of these companies is TESCAN which was founded in 1991 by former Tesla development and service employees. The name TESCAN was derived from the words TESla and SCANning (scanning – screening).

TESCAN originally manufactured programmable controllers, digitizers for older analog scanning electron microscopes, and other small accessories.

Holding structure
In 2013, TESCAN ORSAY HOLDING was established following the merger of the Czech company TESCAN, a leading global developer and supplier of scanning electron microscopes (SEMs) and focused ion beam (FIB) workstations, and the French company ORSAY PHYSICS, a world leader in customized Focused Ion Beam and Electron Beam technology.[6]

The headquarters of the TESCAN ORSAY HOLDING is located in Brno, The Czech Republic. This location serves as the base for production and research and development of all microscopes. From this, about 95% of the total production is exported to locations all over the world via local subsidiaries and distributors.

TESCAN ORSAY HOLDING comprises 7 subsidiaries located in Europe, Asia and the Americas that together employ almost 500 people. TESCAN manufactures about 250 microscopes per year yielding  revenue of approximately US$80 million per annum.

Subsidiaries
To cater for growth into new territories, TESCAN has opened 7 subsidiaries. These regional offices have been established.

TESCAN CHINA, Ltd. – Founded in 2009 and headquartered in the high-tech development area of Shanghai Caohejing and supported by branch offices in Beijing, Wuhan, Guangzhou, Chongqing and Shenyang.

TESCAN USA, Inc. – Acquired in 2010, serves the North American region.

TESCAN-UK, Ltd. – Established in 2013 and Based in Cambridge and covering the UK and Republic of Ireland.

TESCAN FRANCE S.A.R.L. – Established in 2014 and based in Fuveau.

TESCAN BENELUX – Established in 2015, serves the regions of Belgium, Luxembourg and the Netherlands.

TESCAN do BRASIL – Established in 2015, based in Sao Bernardo do Campo, Brazil and services the South American region.

TESCAN GmbH  – Established in 2018, caters to the needs of Germany, Austria and Switzerland.

TESCAN Analytics – Established in 2017 and based in Provence.

TESCAN XRE – Established in 2018 via acquisition of XRE NV, based in Ghent, Belgium.

TESCAN 3DIM – Established in 2017

TESCAN TEMPE – Acquired in 2015 (former AppFive, LLC). USA-based partner for tool development in microscopy.

Technologies

List of patented technologies 
Scanning electron microscope – In beam

Optimization method of assembling and setting system for dust removal from the surface of a sample by focused ion beam and for detecting reversely diffracted electrons and system proposed in such a manner – FIB EBSD

m by making use of characteristic X-ray radiation and knocked-on electrons and apparatus for making the same – TIMA

Sample treatment method in a device with two or more particle beams and apparatus for making the same – Smarpod

Method of reducing or removing organic and/or inorganic contamination of vacuum system of display and analytic devices and apparatus for making the same – Photocatalitic

Analytic system with Raman microscope end electron microscope – CRM SEM

Device for polishing samples by ionic beam – Admission of XeF2

A device for mass spectrometry – O2 for TOF SIMS

A method of analysis of materials by a focused electron beam using the characteristic X-rays and the backscattered electrons and a device for its implementation – TIMA2

A scanning electron microscope and the method of its operation – 3 objective lenses

An objective lens for a device using at least one beam of charged particles – Extraction electrode

SCANNING TRANSMISSION ELECTRON MICROSCOPE WITH AN OBJECTIVE ELECTROMAGNETIC LENS AND A METHOD OF USE THEREOF – STEM CFL

SCANNING TRANSMISSION ELECTRON MICROSCOPE WITH A CONDENSER OBJECTIVE SYSTEM AND A METHOD OF USE THEREOF – STEM CON

SCANNING TRANSMISSION ELECTRON MICROSCOPE – STEM Deflectors

Method of etching one or more of mixed metal and dielectric layers of a semiconductor device – Precursors for delayering

Method for removal of matter – Low angle processing

A device with ion tube and scanning electron microscope – Detector in FIB

A METHOD FOR AUTOMATICALLY ALIGNING A SCANNING TRANSMISSION ELECTRON MICROSCOPE FOR PRECESSION ELECTRON DIFFRACTION DATA MAPPING – STEM drift compensation

Device with at least one adjustable sample holder and method of changing holder tilt angle and method of preparing a lamella – Adjustable holder

Sample display method – Metrological scan mode

Method of automatically detecting the required peak when processing a sample with a focused ion beam – EPD

Method of operation of a charged particle beam device – Sample shift compensation

Handling table tilting element – new Rocking Stage

Products 
SEM’s

FIB-SEM’s (Ga and Xe plasma)

4D-STEM

micro-CT (Computed Tomography)

Product add-ons

Applications 
The company is focused on research, development and manufacturing of scientific instruments and laboratory equipment such as:

 scanning electron microscopes
 supplementary accessories for SEMs
 light optical microscopy accessories and image processing
 special vacuum chambers and custom systems
 detection systems
 scientific hardware and software development

References 
https://analyticalscience.wiley.com/do/10.1002/was.000600157
https://www.tescan.com/

External links 

ISI Brno – The Museum of the Department of Electron Optics
 Installation of Tescan SEM at Flamant Laboratory in Breda, the Netherlands
 Tescan Scanning Electron Microscopes Appoint Distributor in Ireland and the UK

Electronics companies established in 1991
Multinational companies
1991 establishments in Czechoslovakia
Electronics companies of Czechoslovakia
2013 mergers and acquisitions